Crenicichla compressiceps is a species of cichlid native to South America. It is found in the Amazon River basinand in the lower Tocantins River basin.

References

compressiceps
Fish of the Amazon basin
Taxa named by Alex Ploeg
Fish described in 1986